Fausto Marreiros (born 4 May 1966) is a Portuguese speed skater. He competed in the men's 5000 metres event at the 1998 Winter Olympics.

References

1966 births
Living people
Portuguese male speed skaters
Olympic speed skaters of Portugal
Speed skaters at the 1998 Winter Olympics
Place of birth missing (living people)